Dirt track racing is a type of auto racing performed on oval tracks in Canada. While not as widespread as in the U.S., is still quite popular. Most of the provinces offer several venues for both local racing and special events.

Venues

Alberta

British Columbia

Manitoba

New Brunswick

Newfoundland

Northwest Territories

Nova Scotia

Ontario

Quebec

Saskatchewan

Yukon

Ovals
Motorsport in Canada
Auto racing, dirt track ovals